Ubaldo José Heredia Martínez (born May 4, 1956 in Ciudad Bolívar, Venezuela) is a former Major League Baseball right-handed starting pitcher who played for the Montreal Expos in 1987.

Heredia compiled a 0–1 record with six strikeouts and a 5.40 of ERA in 10 innings.

See also
 List of players from Venezuela in Major League Baseball

External links
, or Retrosheet
Venezuelan Professional Baseball League statistics

1956 births
Living people
Acereros de Monclova players
Albuquerque Dukes players
Baltimore Orioles scouts
Bellingham Dodgers players
Caribes de Oriente players
Danville Dodgers players
Indianapolis Indians players
Industriales de Monterrey players
Leones del Caracas players
Llaneros de Portuguesa players
Lodi Dodgers players
Major League Baseball pitchers
Major League Baseball players from Venezuela
Mexican League baseball pitchers
Montreal Expos players
Ogden Dodgers players
Orangeburg Dodgers players
People from Ciudad Bolívar
Rojos del Águila de Veracruz players
San Antonio Dodgers players
Venezuelan expatriate baseball players in Canada
Venezuelan expatriate baseball players in Mexico
Venezuelan expatriate baseball players in the United States